Unga (Unangam tunuu: Uĝnaasaqax̂) is a ghost town on Unga Island in the Aleutians East Borough of the U.S. state of Alaska, about two miles west of Sand Point.  The island's length is 15 miles (24 km).  Unga's altitude is 59 feet (18 m).

History 
It was settled by Aleuts in 1833 and was named Delarov, referring to Evstratii Ivanovich Delarov of the Shelikhov-Golikov Company, with a population of 116. The village was reported as Ougnagok by F. P. Lutke in 1836.

The first post office was established in 1888 and in 1890 Apollo Mining Co. was established. In 1894, its name was changed to Unga. The post office was closed in 1958. In 1969, the last family left Unga. Most of the people who left Unga moved to Sand Point.

Demographics

Unga first appeared on the 1880 U.S. Census as the unincorporated village of "Ounga." Of 185 residents, 101 were Aleut, 69 were Creole (Mixed Russian and Native) and 15 were White. The leader of the town was known as the Unga Wizard. It returned in 1890 under the present spelling of Unga and also included the Oakland fishing station, Apollo mine & Squaw Harbor mine. Of 159 residents, 109 were Creole, 48 were White and two were Asian (oddly, no non-Creole Aleuts or Natives appeared). It continued to return on every successive census until 1960. It did not return in 1970. It was designated an Alaskan Native Village Statistical Area (ANVSA) in 1980, but was uninhabited. It has not reported again since.

References

External links
 http://www.placenames.com/us/p1419430
 http://www.dced.state.ak.us/dca/commdb/CF_BLOCK.cfm?comm_boro_name=Unga&datatype=overview

1833 establishments in the Russian Empire
1958 disestablishments in Alaska
Ghost towns in Alaska
Populated places in Aleutians East Borough, Alaska
Ghost towns in the United States
Ghost towns in North America